Dale C. Copeland is a Professor of international relations with a focus on trade, war and economic interdependence.

Bibliography
 Origins of Major War. Cornell University Press, 2001.
 Economic Interdependence and War. Princeton: Princeton University Press, 2014

See also
Economic interdependence

External links
 Academic Profile
 Publication- Review of International Studies

References

Year of birth missing (living people)
Living people
American political scientists
Johns Hopkins University alumni
University of Chicago alumni
University of Virginia faculty